Tsui Ting Or (born 13 June 1993), known professionally as Poon Choi Ying Chi, is a Hong Kong singer and comedian. She is the director and one of the hosts of the news satire programmes of TV Most and is the vocalist of the band Autumn Cicada. Beside her role in the satire programmes, she has been an opinion leader among the younger generation of Hong Kong people and has impact on the recent emergence of a Hong Kong identity. She is also known for her involvement in pro-democratic activism.

References

External links 
 https://www.facebook.com/poonchoiyingchi/

1992 births
Living people
21st-century Hong Kong actresses
21st-century Hong Kong women singers
Cantopop singers
Hong Kong idols
Hong Kong television actresses